Chagha Hast (also Romanized as Chaghā Hast; also known as Chaqāhast, Cheqā Hast, and Cheqāhast) is a village in Mizdej-e Sofla Rural District, in the Central District of Farsan County, Chaharmahal and Bakhtiari Province, Iran. At the 2006 census, its population was 352, in 73 families. The village is populated by Lurs.

References 

Populated places in Farsan County
Luri settlements in Chaharmahal and Bakhtiari Province